WebGPU is the working name for a potential web standard and JavaScript API for accelerated graphics and compute, aiming to provide "modern 3D graphics and computation capabilities". It is developed by the W3C GPU for the Web Community Group with engineers from Apple, Mozilla, Microsoft, Google, and others.

Unlike WebGL, WebGPU is not a direct port of any existing native API. It is based on APIs provided by Vulkan, Metal, and Direct3D 12 and is intended to provide high performance across mobile and desktop platforms. Mobile platforms will be limited in creation of  objects that will require modern graphics APIs (mentioned above).

The first conceptual prototype called NXT was showcased in early 2017 by the Chromium team.

The Google Chrome Development Team has named it as a "successor" to the WebGL/2 JavaScript APIs.

History
On June 8, 2016, Google showed "Explicit web graphics API" presentation to the WebGL working group (during the bi-annual face to face meeting). The presentation explored the basic ideas and principles of building a new API to eventually replace WebGL, aka "WebGL Next".

On January 24, 2017, Khronos hosted an IP-free meeting dedicated to discussion of "WebGL Next" ideas, collided with WebGL working group meeting in Vancouver. Google team presented the NXT prototype implementing a new API that could run in Chromium with OpenGL, or standalone with OpenGL and Metal. NXT borrowed concepts from all of Vulkan, Direct3D 12, and Metal native APIs. Apple and Mozilla representatives also showed their prototypes built on Safari and Servo correspondingly, both of which closely replicated the Metal API.

W3C Working Group 
On February 7, 2017, Apple's WebKit team proposed the creation of the W3C community group to design the API. At the same time they announced a technical proof of concept and proposal under the name
"WebGPU", based on concepts in Apple's Metal. The WebGPU name was later adopted by the community group as a working name for the future standard rather than just Apple's initial proposal. The initial proposal has been renamed to "WebMetal" to avoid further confusion.

The W3C "GPU for the Web" Community Group was launched on February 16, 2017. At this time, all of Apple, Google, and Mozilla had experiments in the area, but only Apple's proposal was officially submitted to the "gpuweb-proposals" repository.
Shortly after, on March 21, 2017, Mozilla submitted a proposal for WebGL Next within Khronos repository, based on the Vulkan design.

On June 1, 2018, citing "resolution on most-high level issues" in the cross-browser standardization effort, Google's Chrome team announced intent to implement the future WebGPU standard.

Technology 
WebGPU uses its own shading language called WGSL that was designed to be trivially translatable to SPIR-V, until complaints caused redirection into a more traditional design, similar to other shading languages. The syntax is similar to Rust.Tint is a Google-made compiler for WGSL.Naga is a similar project developed for the needs of wgpu-rs.

Implementation 
Both Chrome and Firefox support WebGPU with SPIR-V, with work ongoing for the WGSL front-end. Safari used to support a prototype of WebGPU with WSL, but it is now obsolete and removed in anticipation of progress in WebKit implementation that follows upstream specifications of both WebGPU and WGSL.

See also
Direct3D 12
Khronos Group
Metal (API)
OpenGL
Vulkan
WebCL
WebGL
Web platform

Notes

References

External links

WebGPU specification

WebGPU API Proposal for Apple Webkit in 2017
GPU on the Web Community Group at W3C

3D graphics APIs
Cross-platform software
Graphics standards
Web development